Nez Perce, also spelled Nez Percé or called nimipuutímt (alternatively spelled nimiipuutímt, niimiipuutímt, or niimi'ipuutímt), is a Sahaptian language related to the several dialects of Sahaptin (note the spellings -ian vs. -in). Nez Perce comes from the French phrase nez percé, "pierced nose"; however, Nez Perce, who call themselves nimiipuu, meaning "the people", did not pierce their noses. This misnomer may have occurred as a result of confusion on the part of the French, as it was surrounding tribes who did so.

The Sahaptian sub-family is one of the branches of the Plateau Penutian family (which, in turn, may be related to a larger Penutian grouping). It is spoken by the Nez Perce people of the Northwestern United States.

Nez Perce is a highly endangered language. While sources differ on the exact number of fluent speakers, it is almost definitely under 100. The Nez Perce tribe is endeavoring to reintroduce the language into native usage through a language revitalization program, but (as of 2015) the future of the Nez Perce language is far from assured.

Phonology
The phonology of Nez Perce includes vowel harmony (which was mentioned in Noam Chomsky & Morris Halle's The Sound Pattern of English), as well as a complex stress system described by Crook (1999).

Consonants

Vowels 
Nez Perce has an average-sized inventory of five vowels, each marked for length. Unusually for a five-vowel system, however, it lacks a mid front vowel //, with low front // in its place. Such an asymmetrical configuration is found in less than five percent of the languages that distinguish exactly five vowels, and among those that do display an asymmetry, the "missing" vowel is overwhelmingly more likely to be a back vowel // or // than front //. Indeed, Nez Perce's lack of a mid front vowel within a five-vowel system appears unique, and contrary to basic tendencies toward triangularity in the allocation of vowel space. A potential reason for this peculiarity is discussed in the section on vowel harmony below.

Stress is marked with an acute accent (á, é, í, ó, ú).

Diphthongs 
Nez Perce distinguishes seven diphthongs, all with phonemic length:

Vowel harmony 
Nez Perce displays an extensive system of vowel harmony. Vowel qualities are divided into two opposing sets, "dominant" // and "recessive" //. The presence of a dominant vowel causes all recessive vowels within the same phonological word to assimilate to their dominant counterpart; hence //  "raspberry" becomes //  "for a raspberry" with the addition of the dominant-marked suffix /-/. With very few exceptions, therefore, phonological words may contain only vowels of the dominant or recessive set. Despite occurring in both sets, /i/ is not neutral; instead, it is either dominant or recessive depending on the morpheme in which it occurs.

This system presents a challenge to common concepts of vowel harmony, since it does not appear to be based on obvious considerations of backness, height, or tongue root position. To account for this, Katherine Nelson (2013) proposes that the two sets be considered as distinct "triangles" of vowel space, each by themselves maximally dispersed, where the recessive set is somewhat retracted (further back) in comparison to the dominant:

This dual system would simultaneously explain two apparent phonological aberrances: the absence of a mid front vowel //, and the fact that phonemic /i/ can be marked either as dominant or recessive. Since the three vowels of a given set are placed with regard to the other vowels of the same set, the low height of the front vowel // appears natural (that is, maximally dispersed) against its high counterparts //, as in a three-vowel system such as those of Arabic and Quechua. The high front vowel // meanwhile, is retracted much less in the transition from recessive to dominant - little enough that the distinction does not surface phonemically - and therefore can be placed near to the crux around which the triangle of vowel space is "tilted" by retraction.

Syllable structure 
The Nez Perce syllable canon is CV()(C)(C)(C)(C); that is, a mandatory consonant-vowel sequence with optional vowel length, followed by up to four coda consonants. The arrangement of permitted coda clusters is summarized in the following table, where segments in each column can follow those to their right (C' represents any glottalized consonant), except when the same consonant would occur twice:

Writing system

Grammar

As in many other indigenous languages of the Americas, a Nez Perce verb can have the meaning of an entire sentence in English. This manner of providing a great deal of information in one word is called polysynthesis. Verbal affixes provide information about the person and number of the subject and object, as well as tense and aspect (e.g. whether or not an action has been completed).

History
Asa Bowen Smith developed the Nez Perce grammar by adapting the missionary alphabet used in Hawaiian missions, and adding the consonants s and t. In 1840, Asa Bowen Smith wrote the manuscript for the book Grammar of the Language of the Nez Perces Indians Formerly of Oregon, U.S.. The grammar of Nez Perce has been described in a grammar  and a dictionary  with two dissertations (Rude 1985; Crook 1999).

Case
In Nez Perce, the subject of a sentence, and the object when there is one, can each be marked for grammatical case, an affix that shows the function of the word (compare to English he vs. him vs. his).  Nez Perce employs a three-way case-marking strategy: a transitive subject, a transitive object, and an intransitive subject are each marked differently. Nez Perce is thus an example of the very rare type of tripartite languages (see morphosyntactic alignment).

Because of this case marking, the word order can be quite free. A specific word order tells the hearer what is new information (focus) versus old information (topic), but it does not mark the subject and the object (in English, word order is fixed — subject–verb–object).

Nouns in Nez Perce are marked based on how they relate to the transitivity of the verb. Subjects in a sentence with a transitive verb take the ergative suffix -nim, objects in a sentence with a transitive verb take the accusative suffix -ne, and subjects in sentences with an intransitive verb don’t take a suffix.

This system of marking allows for flexible word order in Nez Perce:

Verb–subject–object word order

Subject–verb–object word order 

Subject–object–verb word order

References

Bibliography
 
 
 Aoki, Haruo. (1979). Nez Perce texts. University of California publications in linguistics (Vol. 90). Berkeley: University of California Press. ., 2, 3
 Aoki, Haruo; & Whitman, Carmen. (1989). Titwáatit: (Nez Perce Stories). Anchorage: National Bilingual Materials Development Center, University of Alaska. . (Material originally published in Aoki 1979).
 Aoki, Haruo; & Walker, Deward E., Jr. (1989). Nez Perce oral narratives. University of California publications in linguistics (Vol. 104). Berkeley: University of California Press. .
 Cash Cash, Phillip. (2004). Nez Perce verb morphology. (Unpublished manuscript, University of Arizona, Tucson).
 Crook, Harold D. (1999). The phonology and morphology of Nez Perce stress. (Doctoral dissertation, University of California, Los Angeles).
 Mithun, Marianne. (1999). The languages of Native North America. Cambridge: Cambridge University Press.  (hbk); .
 Rude, Noel E. (1985). Studies in Nez Perce grammar and discourse. (Doctoral dissertation, University of Oregon).
 Rude, Noel. (1992). Word Order and Topicality in Nez Perce. Pragmatics of Word Order Flexibility, viii, 193-208. John Benjamins Publishing.

Vowel harmony
 
 
 Chomsky, Noam; & Halle, Morris. (1968). Sound pattern of English (pp. 377–378). Studies in language. New York: Harper & Row.
 Hall, Beatrice L.; & Hall, R. M. R. (1980). Nez Perce vowel harmony: An Africanist explanation and some theoretical consequences. In R. M. Vago (Ed.), Issues in vowel harmony (pp. 201–236). Amsterdam: John Benjamins.
 
 Kim, Chin (1978). 'Diagonal' vowel harmony?: Some implications for historical phonology. In J. Fisiak (Ed.), Recent developments in historical phonology (pp. 221–236). The Hague: Mouton.

Language learning materials

Dictionaries and vocabulary 
 Aoki, Haruo. (1994). Nez Perce dictionary. University of California publications in linguistics (Vol. 112). Berkeley: University of California Press. .

Grammar 
 Aoki, Haruo. (1965). Nez Perce grammar. University of California, Berkeley.
 Aoki, Haruo. (1970). Nez Perce grammar. University of California publications in linguistics (Vol. 62). Berkeley: University of California Press. . (Reprinted 1973, California Library Reprint series).

Texts and courses 

 Aoki, Haruo. (1979). Nez Perce texts. University of California publications in linguistics (Vol. 90). Berkeley: University of California Press. ., 2, 3
 Aoki, Haruo; & Whitman, Carmen. (1989). Titwáatit: (Nez Perce Stories). Anchorage: National Bilingual Materials Development Center, University of Alaska. . (Material originally published in Aoki 1979).

 Watters, Mari. (1990). Nez Perce tapes and texts. [5 audio cassettes & 1 booklet]. Moscow, Idaho: Mari Watters Productions, Upward Bound, College of Education, University of Idaho.

External links

Nez Perce language videos, YouTube
 Phillip Cash Cash website (Nez Perce researcher)
 Nez Perce sounds
Joseph Red Thunder: Speech of August 6, 1989 at the Big Hole National Battlefield Commemorating our Nez Perce Ancestors (has audio)
 Hinmatóowyalahtq'it: Speech of 1877 as retold by Jonah Hayes (ca. 1907) (.mov)
 Fox narrative animation (.swf)
 Nez Perce Verb Morphology (.pdf)
 wéeyekweʔnipse ‘to sing one’s spirit song’: Performance and metaphor in Nez Perce spirit-singing (.pdf)
 Tɨmnákni Tímat (Writing from the Heart): Sahaptin Discourse and Text in the Speaker Writing of X̣ílux̣in (.pdf)
A map of American languages (TITUS project)
Nez Percé at the Rosetta Project
OLAC resources in and about the Nez Perce language

Indigenous languages of Idaho
Nez Perce tribe
Sahaptian languages
Vowel-harmony languages
Endangered indigenous languages of the Americas
Native American language revitalization
Endangered languages of the United States